The lieutenant governor of Texas is the second-highest executive office in the government of Texas, a state in the U.S. It is the second most powerful post in Texas government because its occupant controls the work of the Texas Senate and controls the budgeting process as a leader of the Legislative Budget Board. 

Under the provisions of the Texas Constitution, the lieutenant governor is president of the Texas Senate. Unlike with most other states' senates and the U.S. Senate, the lieutenant governor regularly exercises this function rather than delegating it to the president pro tempore or a majority leader. By the rules of the Senate, the lieutenant governor establishes all special and standing committees, appoints all chairpersons and members, and assigns all Senate legislation to the committee of his choice. The lieutenant governor decides all questions of parliamentary procedure in the Senate. The lieutenant governor also has broad discretion in following Senate procedural rules.

The lieutenant governor is an ex officio member of several statutory bodies. These include the Legislative Budget Board, the Legislative Council, the Legislative Audit Committee, the Legislative Board and Legislative Council, which have considerable sway over state programs, the budget and policy. The lieutenant governor is also a member of the Legislative Redistricting Board (together with the speaker of the House, attorney general, comptroller, and land commissioner), which is charged with adopting a redistricting plan for the Texas House of Representatives, Texas Senate, or U.S. House of Representatives after the decennial census if the Legislature fails to do so.

In the case of a vacancy in the lieutenant governor's office, the Senate elects one of its members to act as President of the Senate until the next statewide office election, in effect becoming the lieutenant governor. A senator elected as presiding officer in this way retains their district seat and the voting privileges entailed with his Senate election.
The lieutenant governor is sworn-in on the third Tuesday every four years, the same as the governor.

Dan Patrick has been the lieutenant governor of Texas since January 20, 2015. 

The term of office was two years from 1846 to 1972. Voters then increased it to four years, effective for the 1974 election. 

The lieutenant governor assumes the powers of the governor of Texas when the governor is out of the state or otherwise unable to discharge the office. The lieutenant governor is elected separately from the governor, rather than on the same ticket; it is therefore possible for the governor and lieutenant governor to be from different political parties (which was the case during Governor George W. Bush's first term and also during Bill Clements's two non-consecutive terms). The lieutenant governor becomes the governor if the elected governor resigns, dies or is removed from office via impeachment and conviction. Former governor Rick Perry took office upon George W. Bush's resignation on December 21, 2000. Bush became US President on January 20, 2001.  When Perry became lieutenant governor on 19 January 1999, he became the first Republican since Albert Jennings Fountain in 1873 to serve as lieutenant governor, and the first Republican to be elected as lieutenant governor since James W. Flanagan  in 1869.

Compared to other lieutenant governors
Texas is one of the few states that vests significant power in the office of lieutenant governor, making it among the most influential. By contrast, the lieutenant governor position in other states has few (if any) legislative responsibilities, akin to the vice president of the United States. The consequence is that the governor of Texas is weaker than other states' governors.

Lieutenant Governors of Texas 
 Parties

References 

 Legislative Reference Library of Texas
 Presiding Officers of the Texas Legislature, 1846–1982, Texas Legislative Council, Austin, Texas, August 1982.

External links

Duties and Powers of the lieutenant governor

 
Texas Senate